Ippolito Aldobrandini may refer to various members of the Aldobrandini family:

 Pope Clement VIII (1536–1605)
 Cardinal Ippolito Aldobrandini "junior", cardinal in the 1590s
 Ippolito Aldobrandini (cardinal) (1596–1638), grandnephew of Pope Clement VIII